
Gmina Mordy is an urban-rural gmina (administrative district) in Siedlce County, Masovian Voivodeship, in east-central Poland.

Villages
Apart from the town of Mordy, Gmina Mordy contains the villages and settlements of Czepielin, Czepielin-Kolonia, Czołomyje, Doliwo, Głuchów, Klimonty, Kolonia Mordy, Krzymosze, Leśniczówka, Ogrodniki, Olędy, Ostoje, Pieńki, Pióry Wielkie, Pióry-Pytki, Płosodrza, Ptaszki, Radzików Wielki, Radzików-Kornica, Radzików-Oczki, Radzików-Stopki, Rogóziec, Sosenki-Jajki, Stara Wieś, Stok Ruski, Suchodół Wielki, Suchodołek, Wielgorz, Wojnów, Wólka Soseńska, Wólka-Biernaty and Wyczółki.

Neighbouring gminas
Gmina Mordy is bordered by the city of Siedlce and by the gminas of Łosice, Olszanka, Paprotnia, Przesmyki, Siedlce, Suchożebry and Zbuczyn.

References

Polish official population figures 2006

Mordy
Siedlce County